Willem Isaacsz van Swanenburg (29 January 1580 – 31 May 1612), was a Dutch Golden Age engraver and the youngest son of Isaac van Swanenburg. Isaac van Swanenburg raised three sons who all became artists. Isaac van Swanenburg was also an artist who painted, designed prints, and created stained glass windows.  The subject matter of his art included Biblical scenes, genre scenes, and portraits. He was also an illustrator for many books during his time.

Biography
Swanenburg was born in Leiden.  He learned drawing and engraving from his father, together with his brothers Jacob (1572–1652) and Claes (1572–1652), who both became respected painters. According to Houbraken he was a respected engraver who became "Hopman" (flag-bearer) of the Leiden schutterij, but died young.

References

Willem Isaaksz Swanenburgh on artnet

External links

Vermeer and The Delft School, a full text exhibition catalog from The Metropolitan Museum of Art, which contains material on Willem Isaacsz Swanenburg

1580 births
1612 deaths
16th-century engravers
17th-century engravers
Artists from Leiden
Flemish engravers